Events of 2019 in Libya.

Incumbents
 President: Aguila Saleh Issa
 Prime Minister: Abdullah al-Thani

Events 
 April 4 – Second Libyan Civil War: The Libyan National Army (LNA) launches a surprise offensive in western Libya, moving units towards the Government of National Accord-held capital Tripoli and capturing Gharyan.
 July 3 – 2019 Tajoura migrant center airstrike: An airstrike by Field Marshal Khalifa Haftar's Libyan National Army hits the Tajoura Detention Center outside Tripoli, Libya, while hundreds of people are inside the facility, killing at least 53 of them and injures 130 others.
 December 19 – Libya's Government of National Accord activates a cooperation accord with Turkey, allowing for a potential Turkish military intervention in the Second Libyan Civil War.

Deaths

References

 
2010s in Libya
Years of the 21st century in Libya
Libya
Libya